Aillen or Áillen is an incendiary being in Irish mythology. He played the harp and was known to sing beautiful songs.

Character
Called "the burner", he is a member of the Tuatha Dé Danann who resides in Mag Mell, the underworld.

Deeds
According to The Boyhood Deeds of Fionn, he would burn Tara to the ground every year at Samhain with his fiery breath after lulling all the inhabitants to sleep with his music. This only ended with the arrival of Fionn mac Cumhaill, who inhaled the poison from his spear to keep himself awake and slew Aillen. The act won him the leadership of the Fianna.

Names
Áillen was also a popular personal name in ancient Ireland and was used by several personages. The fertility goddess Áine is also sometimes known by this name.

Fenian Cycle
Fire gods
Tuatha Dé Danann
Articles lacking sources from June 2009
All articles lacking sources